Carl August Ringvold Jr. (16 December 1902 – 27 August 1961) was a Norwegian sailor who competed in the 1924 Summer Olympics. In 1924 he won the gold medal as crew member of the Norwegian boat Bera in the 8 metre class event. He is the son of Carl Ringvold.

References

External links
profile

1902 births
1961 deaths
Norwegian male sailors (sport)
Olympic sailors of Norway
Sailors at the 1924 Summer Olympics – 8 Metre
Olympic gold medalists for Norway
Olympic medalists in sailing
Medalists at the 1924 Summer Olympics